Flavor of Life is the first and only studio album by Japanese pop unit Soul Crusaders. It was released on October 3, 2001, through Giza Studio.

Background
The album consists of three previous released singles, such as "Safety Love", "Lonesome Tonight ~Kimi dake Mitsumeteru~" and "Baby Sweet Sunshine".

The lyricist and keyboardist of Japanese pop band Garnet Crow, Nana Azuki and Giza composer Aika Ohno were involved with the album production.

The single Safety Love was released in the Giza Studio's compilation album Giza Studio Masterpiece Blend 2001, it was released again in compilation album GIZA studio presents -Girls- which released in 2011.

This is their last music release. In 2002, they disbanded.

Charting performance
The album charted at #28 on the Oricon charts in its first week. Charted for 3 weeks and sold more than 13,280 copies.

Track listing
All the songs were arranged by Hiroshi Terao

Personnel
Credits adapted from the CD booklet of Flavor of Life".

Tomomi Morishita – vocalist, lyricist
King Opal – lyricist, rap
Hiroshi Terao – composing, arranging, backing vocals, keyboard
Aika Ohno – composing
Nana Azuki (Garnet Crow) – composing
Sayaka Takasaki – composing
Dr.Terachi&Dj Me-Ya – programming, keyboard
Takashi Masuzaki (Dimension) – guitar
Secil Minami – backing vocals
Mika Katsuta – backing vocals
Rika Takeuchi – backing vocals
Toshihide Nakai – backing vocals

Sawako Ryuko – mixing, digital sound design
Tatsuya Okada – recording
Masahiro Shimada – mastering
Birdman Mastering – mastering
Toshiyuki Ebihara – artist repertory
Shinichi Takagi – artist relation
Emi Akuzawa – artist relation
Makoto Iwasawa – artist relation
Ayako Asada – production management
Toshinobu Iwata – artist management
Takehiko Kawasaki – artist management
Katsuyuki Yoshimatsu – assistant engineering
Gan Kojima – art direction, design
Kanonji – producing

References

2001 albums
Being Inc. albums
Japanese-language albums
Giza Studio albums
Albums produced by Daiko Nagato